The 1949–50 season was the 48th in the history of the Western Football League.

This was the first and only season in the history of the Western League in which it consisted of three divisions. Division Three was created largely from reserve sides of existing members, but was abandoned at the end of the season.

The champions for the first time in their history were Wells City, and the winners of Division Two were new club Barnstaple Town. Bideford Town won Division Three, only dropping one point.

Division One
Division One remained at eighteen members with two clubs promoted to replace Clevedon and Bristol City Colts, who were relegated to Division Two. Weymouth had moved up to the Southern League and were replaced in Division One by their Reserves.

Cheltenham Town Reserves, runners-up in Division Two
Chippenham United, champions of Division Two

Division Two
Division Two remained at eighteen clubs, after Cheltenham Town Reserves and Chippenham United were promoted to Division One, and RAF Melksham left the league. Three new clubs joined:

Bridgwater Town
Bristol City Colts, relegated from Division One.
Clevedon, relegated from Division One.
Swindon Town replaced their Reserves with their Colts.

Division Three
Division Three consisted of eleven clubs, all of which were new to the Western League except Bristol Rovers "A", this side rejoining the league having left in 1939. Seven of the other ten clubs were reserve sides of clubs in Divisions One and Two.

References

1949-50
4